Antonis Ladakis (born 25 January 1982) is a Greek former professional footballer who played as a midfielder.

Career
Born in Kavala, Ladakis began playing professional football with ILTEX Lykoi in 2000. He joined Agrotikos Asteras for two seasons in 2004. He signed with Asteras Tripolis in 2006. After six years in Asteras Tripolis, he joined Panthrakikos in the summer of 2012.

References

External links
Guardian Football
Profile at Onsports.gr

1982 births
Living people
Greek footballers
Asteras Tripolis F.C. players
Panthrakikos F.C. players
Association football midfielders
Footballers from Kavala